David Husvik is a Norwegian drummer who has played in metal bands Extol, Absurd², Twisted Into Form and InSection and Aperture, a jazz and acoustic rock project. David Husvik helped to start Pirates N 'Thieves in 2007. He also performed in a side-project of Extol called Ganglion.

Background
Husvik began his musical career with Extol. The band has been highly influential to bands all around. The band has been Husvik's main musical career before the band disbanded in 2007, where Husvik took a musical break alongside his cousin Peter Espevoll, while the remaining three members, went on to form Mantric. Evidently, Husvik was a part of the first lineup of Mantric, but later left. During his time in Extol, Husvik also performed with Absurd² and The Crest. The band, Absurd², consisted of Husvik, former Extol guitarist and cousin Christer Espevoll, Magnus Westgaard of fellow Norwegian band Vardøger, and Ivar Nikolaisem of Silver. While, The Crest, Husvik was in from 1996, until 2001. In 2011 he produced an album for the Norwegian hardcore band Shevils. Extol reunited in 2013, with Husvik and Peter being the two original members, alongside Ole Børud. In 2013, Husvik was present at Elements of Rock Festival in 2013, though Extol was not present. Though Extol was not present, Husvik was there as a roadie for Jayson Sherlock, formerly of Mortification. Husvik and Børud were the final remaining members of Extol in 2013, as Espevoll decided to depart, which led Husvik to form Azusa with former Guitarist and his cousin Christer, while Børud formed Fleshkiller. In 2018, Extol returned from their hiatus, with Husvik and the Espevoll brothers. Shortly thereafter, Azusa released their first single "Interstellar Islands", signed to Extol's former label, Solid State Records, and announced their lineup of Husvik, Christer, Liam Wilson (ex-The Dillinger Escape Plan, ex-Frodus, John Frum) and Eleni Zafiriadou (Sea + Air). In 2020, it was announced that Husvik would perform drums on former Tourniquet guitarist Gary Lenaire's solo album, which would also feature Guy Ritter, Luke Easter, and Erik Mendez, who all performed in the early days of Tourniquet. The band was later announced by Michael Sweet of Stryper as FLOOD, consisting of Husvik, Lenaire, Ritter, Mendez, and Anna Sentina.

Bands
Current
Extol (1993-2007, 2012–present)
Azusa (2014–present)
FLOOD (2020–present)
Aperture
InSection

Live
Mantric (2007-2009 [Official]; 2011-present)

Former
Absurd² (1999-2004)
The Crest (1996-2001)
Doctor Midnight & The Mercy Cult (2009–2011)
Ganglion
Twisted Into Form (2000–2012)

Discography
Extol

Studio albums
 1998: Burial
 2000: Undeceived
 2003: Synergy
 2005: The Blueprint Dives
 2013: Extol

EPs
 1999: Mesmerized
 2001: Paralysis

Compilations
 1996: Northern Lights / Norwegian Metal Compilation (Rowe Productions 012)

Videos
 2015: Of Light and Shade

Absurd²
 2004: Absurd² EP

The Crest
 1999: Childhood's End / Thorn
 1999: Thunderfuel
 2000: Dark Rock Armada

Twisted Into Form
 2000: Then Comes Affliction to Awaken the Dreamer

Ganglion
 2002: Ganglion (7")
 2003: Stripped

Aperture
 2006: Salvage

Doctor Midnight & the Mercy Cult
 2013: I Declare: Treason
 2013: (Don't) Waste It

Azusa
 2018: Heavy Yoke
 2020: Loop of Yesterdays

References

Norwegian drummers
Male drummers
1977 births
Living people
Musicians from Bærum
Christian metal musicians
21st-century Norwegian drummers
21st-century Norwegian male musicians
Doctor Midnight & The Mercy Cult members
Extol members